Srilankametrus gravimanus is a species of scorpion belonging to the family Scorpionidae. It is native to India and Sri Lanka.

Description
This large scorpion has a total length of about 75 to 110 mm. Adults are uniformly reddish brown in color. Male has 13 to 16 pectinal teeth, whereas female has 11 to 13 pectinal teeth. Male has slightly longer pedipalp femur and patella than female. Chela lobiform, which is narrow in male. Manus covered by rounded granules. Pedipalp patella is smooth, and without pronounced internal tubercle. Carapace smooth, and glossy. Telson elongate. Hemispermatophore is lamelliform.

During the hemolytic and enzymic investigations of the crude venom, both direct and indirect (phospholipase A) hemolysins were identified from the species.

References

External links
 Animal World

Scorpionidae
Endemic fauna of India
Endemic fauna of Sri Lanka
Animals described in 1894